Ambalangoda is a coastal town located in Galle District, Southern Province of Sri Lanka. Governed by Ambalangoda Urban Council, the town is famous for its ancient demon masks and devil dancers.

Transport 
Ambalangoda  is served by Sri Lanka Railways' Coastal Line. Ambalangoda Railway Station, built in 1894, is a major station on the line, and is connected to the major cities Colombo and Galle by rail. It is served by the A2 highway, which runs through the town.

http://www.ambalangoda.ds.gov.lk/index.php/en/railway-stations

Schools 
Some of the schools situated in Ambalangoda are listed below:
 Dharmasoka College
 Sri Devananda College
 Prajapathi Gothami Balika Vidyalaya
 P. De S. Kularathna Maha Vidyalaya

History 

Owing to the abundance of cinnamon in its hinterlands, Ambalangoda was the site of a Dutch East India Company outpost in the 18th century. Consisting of a rest-house (now demolished) and a court building on a small bluff overlooking the beach, it served as the residence for the local Dutch magistrate and dignitaries traveling to Galle and Colombo. British Military Governor Frederick North is reported to have spent a night at the rest house during his tour around Ceylon in 1803. Simon Casie Chitty, in his Ceylon Gazetteer in 1833, gives the following account;
In his travel guide Book of Ceylon in 1907, Henry William Cave describes Ambalangoda as "a pleasant seaside place where good accommodation and excellent food can be obtained, and where the rare luxury of bathing in the open sea can be enjoyed in perfect security". The rest house, said to have been a comfortable hostelry consisting of eight bedrooms, was razed by an act of a local politician in 2009. The courthouse survives to date.

Masks and puppetry 

The town is renowned for the manufacture of wooden masks and puppets. The traditional masks are carved from light Balsa like Kaduru wood (Nux vomica). Kaduru trees grow in the marshy lands bordering paddy fields. The wood is smoke dried for a week in preparation. The hand carved and hand painted masks in traditional dance dramas are both vibrant and colorful.

Masks are created for three different types of dancing rituals: 'Kolam', which tell mocking stories of traditional Sri Lankan colonial life; 'Sanni', or devil dancing masks, used in a type of exorcism ceremony to heal people of persisting illnesses believed to be inflicted by demons; and 'Raksha' masks, which are used in festivals and processions. Local puppet shows, showing dramas, comedies and folk tales were also a popular form of entertainment. Influences from South India, Asia and Europe are assumed to have been the shaping factor in the art of mask dancing and puppetry.
The Naga Raksha (Cobra demon) mask of the '' (demon dance), consists of a ferocious face with bulging, popping & staring eyes, a carnivorous tongue lolling out of a wide mouth armed to the hilt with set of fanged teeth, all topped by a set of cobra hoods.

With the practices of traditional exorcism, mask dancing and puppetry shows in the decline, the art of mask carving has seen a reduction of interest. Though only a few of the antique originals survive, the local mask museum retains an interesting collection of reproductions and provides displays of carving techniques for visitors.

Attractions
Siri Vijayarama Viharaya (Hirewaththa)Temple.
Conservation Center for Traditional Masks and Dance - Tukka Wadu Gunadasa Generation (https://goo.gl/maps/5VC5rTYSx21nLN766 )
Dutch Courthouse (Built in 1750)
Ambalangoda Mask Museum
Galgoda Sailatalaramaya Maha Vihara Temple - South Asia's longest statue of a reclining Buddha
Sunandarama Vihara - one of the oldest Buddhist temples on the southern coast, with the largest Thorana (gateway arch) in Sri Lanka
Madu River Wetlands - the 915-hectare Madu Ganga Estuary is connected by two narrow channels to the Randombe Lake, forming       a complex wetland system encompassing 64 mangrove islets. It is a Ramsar classified wetland.
Rock pool - A natural beach pool formed out of two angled rocks on the beach behind the (former) rest house(Old). Mentioned in several historical accounts as a safe spot for bathers.

Cuisine 
Ambalangoda has maintained a strong attachment towards seafood from its long standing affiliation with the fishing industry. The local specialties, most of which consist of spiced dishes of fish, include;

 Biling Achcharu - A spicy condiment made from dried , Maldive fish and chilies.
 Fish  - A fish dish, mainly tuna, cooked dry in a thick seasoning of pepper, lime, salt and spices.
 Fish  - Fish preserved in a marination of lime, vinegar and salt.

References

External links 
 Ambalangoda Divisional Secretariat
 Discover Sri Lanka - More information & images about Ambalangoda

 
Populated places in Southern Province, Sri Lanka